James "Biddy" Wood was a  film journalist, promoter, and disc jockey. He reported from Washington D.C. and edited the Afro-American Newspaper, also reporting on nightlife and jazz activity along Baltimore's Pennsylvania Avenue. He also owned a club and produced newsreels with William D. Alexander.

He was born in Lexington, Kentucky. His parents were Francis Marion Wood, the first Superintendent of Baltimore City Colored Schools, and Nellie née Hughes Wood. He graduated from Douglass High School and served in the military during World War II. He graduated from Howard University with a degree in Fine Arts.

Wood married Damita Jo DeBlanc who was one of the performers he managed. He was preceded in death by his son John Jeffrey Wood.

References

Year of birth missing
2011 deaths